Josip Smodlaka (9 November 1869 – 31 May 1956) was an Austrian, Yugoslav and Croatian politician who served two brief terms as Mayor of Split.

References

Mayors of Split, Croatia
1869 births
1956 deaths
Yugoslavism
People from the Kingdom of Dalmatia